Delphinium: A Childhood Portrait of Derek Jarman is a 2009 short film based on the early years, work, and legacy of British artist and filmmaker Derek Jarman.  The film was written and directed by Matthew Mishory and produced by Iconoclastic Features.  It was executive produced by Andreas Andrea.  Keith Collins, Jarman's surviving muse, participated in the making of the film.  Jonathan Caouette served as a creative advisor.  It is the first narrative work about the life of Derek Jarman.

Soundtrack
The original score was composed by Arban Severin and Steven Severin, founding member of Siouxsie and the Banshees and The Glove.  The first ever appearance by Siouxsie and the Banshees in a motion picture had been a brief scene in Jarman's Jubilee (1978 film).

Cast
The ensemble cast includes Samuel Garfield as a teenage Derek Jarman, Australian actor Jeremiah Dupre as The Groundskeeper, Keith Collins as  The Man in the Window, Edward Singletary, Jr., as The Headmaster, Dalilah Rain as Betts Jarman, Kamran Ali as the young Derek, and Clint Catalyst as The Interviewee.

Production history
From inception to delivery, the film took two years to complete, including fundraising efforts, principal photography, and post-production; large sections were shot on super 8 at Jarman's iconic Prospect Cottage in Dungeness, Kent, and other scenes were shot in SoHo and on the Hampstead Heath in London.

Reception
The film has been described as a "stylized and lyrical coming-of-age portrait of legendary painter, filmmaker, and activist Derek Jarman's artistic, sexual, and political awakening in post-War England." It had its world premiere at the 2009 Reykjavik International Film Festival in Iceland, its UK premiere at the Raindance Film Festival in London, and its California premiere at the 2010 Frameline International Film Festival in San Francisco.  It won the Eastman Kodak Grand Prize for Best Short Film at the 2010 United States Super 8 and DV Film Festival and in 2011 was permanently installed in the British Film Institute's National Film Archive in London in the special collection Beautiful Things, "a major collection of over 100 films and television programmes that chronicle and explore queer representation and identities over the last century."  The film received two sold-out screenings at the BFI Southbank as part of the British Film Institute's 2011 London Lesbian and Gay Film Festival.  The film was released theatrically in Berlin at the Kino Moviemento and on DVD and VOD in the UK, North America, Germany, and France.  In 2014, the film was re-released by the BFI as part of the Jarman2014 celebration. The film was later released by the BFI on its streaming platform BFI Player.

References

External links
Official Website

Official Facebook

2009 short films
2009 films
American LGBT-related films
British LGBT-related films
Films about film directors and producers
Gay-related films
2000s English-language films
2000s American films
2000s British films